Meagan Kiely (born 15 December 1994) is an Australian rules footballer playing for the Richmond Football Club in the AFL Women's (AFLW). Kiely was drafted by Richmond with their third selection and forty eighth overall in the 2021 AFL Women's draft. She made her debut against  at RSEA Park in the first round of the 2022 season.

Statistics
Statistics are correct to round 4, 2022

|- style="background-color: #eaeaea"
! scope="row" style="text-align:center" | 2022
|style="text-align:center;"|
| 31 || 4 || 2 || 0 || 19 || 20 || 39 || 6 || 19 || 0.5 || 0 || 4.8 || 5.0 || 9.8 || 1.5 || 4.8
|- 
|- class="sortbottom"
! colspan=3| Career
! 4
! 2
! 0
! 19
! 20
! 39
! 6
! 19
! 0.5
! 0
! 4.8
! 5.0
! 9.8
! 1.5
! 4.8
|}

References

External links
 
 

1994 births
Living people
Richmond Football Club (AFLW) players
Australian rules footballers from Tasmania